Harisree Ashokan is an Indian actor and director who is known for his comedy roles in Malayalam films. Ashokan has acted in more than 200 Malayalam films. He started his career as a mimicry artist in the troupe Harisree and then worked in Kalabhavan.

Early life
Ashokan (nicknamed Babu) was born as the sixth child among ten children to the late Kunjappan and late Janaki on April 6, 1964,  at Ernakulam, Kochi. He has nine siblings, the late Raveendran, the late Sasindran, Mohanan, Anil, Sunil, Santha, Vimala, and the late Sujatha. He had his primary education from MIHS Ernakulam. After tenth he joined Kuyilin's Cochin Kalavedi. He holds a diploma in Telecom Engineering from Ernakulam, Kerala. He found work as an assistant lineman in 1984 with the Telecom Department in Cochin, Kerala. He worked until 1987 when he rose to become a lineman. While working there he joined Kalabhavan and worked for 6 years and later moved to Harisree, after which he began to be called 'Harisree Ashokan'. His elder brother was also a telecom officer.

Asokan was always interested in acting and was an amateur theatre actor. He got his first break with the movie Parvathy Parinayam directed by P.G. Viswambharan where he played the role of a beggar.

Career
Ashokan made his screen debut in the 1986 movie Pappan Priyappetta Pappan. He played several numerous roles in the next years. Among these, he was noted for the role of beggar in the 1994 movie Parvathy Parinayam. This role gave the first breakthrough in his film career. He acted in around ten movies in 1994 itself after acting in Parvathy Parinayam. It was the movie Vrudhanmare Sookshikkuka in 1994, which gave him the major breakthrough, where he played one of the lead roles alongside Dileep, with whom Ashokan eventually formed one of the most celebrated comedy duos in Malayalam film industry throughout his career.

In the 1998 movie Punjabi House, Ashokan played the character Ramanan, which is considered one of the best comedy characters in Malayalam films. Many consider this as the best performance by Harishree Ashokan in his career which developed a cult following several years after its release. The Dileep-Harishree Ashokan's other hit movie is Ee Parakkum Thalika, which was released in 2001, where he played the role of Sundaran. He played the character of Sugunan in the 2002 movie Meesha Madhavan, which became the highest grossing Malayalam movie of that year. Harishree Ashokan's most famous roles in his career came out in 2003. In the slapsick comedy C.I.D. Moosa, he played the role of Thorappan Kochunni and in the movie Pulival Kalyanam, he became Theeppori Kuttappan. He played the character Krishankutty in Thilakkam. His role as Ugran in the movie Chronic Bachelor was also appreciated by the audience. All these films were major blockbusters in 2003.

In the 2005 Malayalam movie Boyy Friennd, Ashokan played the villain role for the first time in his career.

Dileep and Harishree Ashokan is a popular comedy pairing in Malayalam cinema. The duo have acted together in plenty of movies. Vriddanmarund Sookshikkuga, Punjabi House, Ee Parakkum Thalika, Meesa Madhavan, C.I.D Moosa, Thilakkam, Runway, Kochi Rajavu,  Pandippada, Crazy Gopalan, Chess, Kuberan, Kaaryastan are some among the major movies among them.

Ashokan made his directional debut through the 2019 movie An International Local Story.

Personal life
He is married to Preetha. The couple have two children, Sreekutty and Malayalam film actor Arjun Ashokan.

Filmography

As Director :

 An International Local Story (debut)

His released Malayalam films as an Actor includes :

2022 
Priyan Ottathilanu  as Kuppi Rajan

2021
 Keshu Ee Veedinte Nadhan as Kunjikrishnan
 Minnal Murali as Dasan

2019
 Ilayaraja

2018
 TheneechayumPeerankippadayum
 Daivame Kaithozham K. Kumar Akanam
 Oru Pazhaya Bomb Kadha

2017
 Honey Bee 2.5
 Honey Bee 2
 Role Models as Ramanan
 Parava

2016
 Thoppil Joppan

2015
 3 Wicketinu 365 Runs
 Bhaskar The Rascal

2014
 To Let Ambadi Talkies
 Aamayum Muyalum

2013
 Ezhu Sundara Rathrikal as Abid
 Geethaanjali as Fake Swami
 Pullipulikalum Aattinkuttiyum as Susheelan
 Kadal Kadannoru Mathukkutty as Rafi
 Blackberry as Madhavan
 Pigman as Thimmayyan
 Radio as Johnson

2012
 Bavuttiyude Namathil as Alavi
 Vaadhyar
 Asuravithu
 Prabhuvinte Makkal
 Scene onnu Nammude Veedu
 Perinoru Makan
 MLA Mani Pathamclassum Gusthiyum
 Doctor Innocent aanu as Pookkoya
 Mullassery Madhavan Kutty Nemom P. O. as Shashankan Pravachambalam
 Kunjaliyan as Veeramani 
 Orkut Oru Ormakoot as Narayanan
 Oru Kudumba Chithram as Gopikuttan

2011
 Swapna Sanchari
 Orma Mathram
 Lucky Jokers
 Manushyamrugam
 15 August
 Snehadaram
 Uppukandam Brothers Back in Action
 Maharaja Talkies

2010
 Puthumukhangal
 Kaaryasthan
 Neelambari as Sundaran
 Holidays
 In Ghost House Inn as Ernest
 Janakan
 Valiyangadi
 Bombay Mittayi
 Advocat Lakshmanan Ladies Only
 Bodyguard
 Swantham Bharya Zindabad as Uthaman

2009
 Loud Speaker as Kathanar
 Suhruthu
 Colours as Gopi
 Utharaswayamvaram as Sarassappan
 Bharya Swantham Suhruthu
 Swantham Lekhakan
 Rahasya Police
 Passenger as Varghese
 Vairam: Fight For Justice as Sugunan
 Chemistry
 Banaras as Paul
 Janakan
 Kancheepurathe Kalyanam as P.M. Premachandran
 Moz & Cat

2008
 Crazy Gopalan as Harishchandran
 Twenty:20
 College Kumaran
 Annan Thambi
 Swarnam
 Kabadi Kabadi as Biju
 Bullet

2007
 Sooryan
 Mouryan
 Ottakayyan
 Kangaroo
 Janmam
 Nagaram as Parashuraman
 Rock & Roll as Balu
 Black Cat as Caesar
 Aakasham as Manoharan
 Athishayan as S.P Damodaran
 Inspector Garud as Kuttappan
 Changathipoocha as Aishwaryan

2006
 Chess as Kallan Bhaskaran
 Kilukkam Kilukilukkam as Ponnappan
 Thuruppu Gulan as Shathru
 Chacko Randaaman as Usman
 Parayam
 Lion
 Rakshakan
 Babakalyani
 Moonamathoral
 Madhuchandralekha as Digambaran

2005
 Boyy Friennd as Thankappan
 Pandippada as Bhasi
 Ben Johnson
 Kochi Rajavu as Komalan
 Hridayathil Sookshikkan
 Iruvattam Manavatti
 Lokanathan IAS
 Vacation as V Naran
 Kalyanakurimanam
 Bus Conductor
 Junior senior as Jeeva
 Otta Nanayam as Paramu

2004
 Maampazhakkaalam as Sulaiman
 Runway as Porinchu
 Thekkekkara Superfast as Bhairavan
 Vajram as Achu
 Kusruthi as Kumaran
 Thalamelam as Guinness Gopalan
 Vismayathumbathu as Gopan
 C.I. Mahadevan 5 Adi 4 Inchu as Dasappan
 Kerala House Udan Vilpanakku as Vallabhan

2003
 Pulival Kalyanam as Theeppori Kuttappan
 Valathottu Thirinjal Nalamathe Veedu as Suresh
 Melvilasam Sariyanu as Pushkaran
 Balettan as Manikandan
 Achante Kochumolkku as Anthappan
 C.I.D. Moosa as Thurappan Kochunni 
 Thilakkam as Krishnan Kutty
 Chronic Bachelor as Ugran
 Thillana Thillana as Govind
 Varum Varunnu Varunnu

2002
 Meesha Madhavan as Sugunan
 Bamboo Boys as Nakki
 Jagathi Jagathish in Town as Udakku Chempakaraman
 Kaiyethum Doorath as Appunni
 Kattuchempakam
 Pakalpooram
 Kayamkulam Kanaran
 www.anukudumbam.com
 Kuberan as Theyyunni
 Oomappenninu Uriyadappayyan as Kochu Kuttan
 Pranyamanithooval as Ponnappan
 Savithriyude Aranjanam as Neelakandan

2001
 Sundrapurushan as Philipose
 Ee Parakkum Thalika as Sundaresan M. K
 Sharja To Sharja as Lohi
 Andolanam
 Nagaravadhu
 Prnayamanthram
 Naranathu Thampuran
 Megasandesam as Kuttikrishnan
 Nakshathragal Parayathirunnathu as Shashankan
 Rakshasa Rajav as Pathrose

2000
 Nadan Pennum Nattupramaniyum as Pachu
 Kattuvannu Vilichappol as Velappan
 Sathyam Sivam Sundaram as Blindman
 Varavay
 Anamuttathe Angalamar as Ramanan
 Millenium Stars
 Vinayapoorvam Vidhyadharan
 Ee Mazha Thenmazha
 Kallu Kondoru Pennu
 Melevaryathe Malakhakuttikal

1999
 Chandamama as Bhaskaran
 Charlie Chaplin
 Deepasthambham Mahascharyam
 Onnam Vattom Kandappol
 Pranaya Nilavu
 Bharyaveettil Paramasukam
 Pattabhishekam as Bhairavan
 Jananayakan as Dominic
 Auto Brothers
 Tokyo Nagarathile Viseshangal
 Udayapuram Sulthan as Augustine

1998
 Mayajalam as Manivarnnan
 Punjabi House as Ramanan
 Kunkumacheppu
 Amma Ammayiamma
 Nakshatratharattu as Darling Hariharan
 Gramapanchayath as Swa Le

1997
 Ikkareyanente Manasam as Thankappan
 The Good Boys as Kunjandi
 Hitler Brothers as Bhakthavalsalan
 Aniathipravu as Chippayi
 Poothumbiyum Povalanmarum
 Moonukodiyum Munoorupavanum
 Oru Mutham Manimutham
 Arjunanpillayum Anjumakkalum as Thankakkuttan 
Ishtadanam
Mannadiar Penninu Chenkotta Checkan as Aromal

1996
 Kaathil Oru Kinnaram as John Samuel
 Malayala Masom Chingam Onnu as Kochuraman
 Mr. Clean as Iymootty
 Harbour as Usman
 Kudumbakodathi as Sarathy
 Kinnam Katta Kallan
 Aramanaveedum Anjoorekkarum
 Nandagopalnte Kusruthikal
 Ee Puzhayum Kadannu
Kanjirapally Kariyachan
 Kalyana Sowgandhikam as Bahuleyan
 Kanchanam

1995
 Mannar Mathai Speaking as Sandhyavu (Disciple of Garvasses Asan)
 Sindoora Rekha
 Tom & Jerry
 Vrudhanmare Sookshikkuka as Dharmaraj/Daniel
 Kalyanji Anantji
 Alenjeri Thambrakkal
 Achan Raajavu Appan Jethavu
 Three Men Army as Susheelan
 Kokkarakko as Servent 
 Mimics Action 500
 Keerthanam
 Parvathy Parinayam as Beggar

1994
 Vadhu Doctoranu as Snake charmer
 Manathe Kottaram
Kudumba Visesham as Abubacker

1993 
 Sakshal Sreeman Chathunni
 Porutham as Gulumalu Jamal
 Vakkeel Vasudev 
 Ammayane Sathyam (1993)

1992
 First Bell as Mental Patient 

1991
 Godfather as Man at Anjooran's patio

1989
 Ramji Rao Speaking as Man on the telephone

1986
 Pappan Priyappetta Pappan

References

Living people
Male actors from Kochi
Male actors in Malayalam cinema
Indian male film actors
1959 births
Indian male comedians
20th-century Indian male actors
21st-century Indian male actors
Malayalam comedians